Silchar - Guwahati Express is an Express train belonging to Northeast Frontier Railway zone of Indian Railways that connects the second largest city & largest city of Assam,  and . This train is a replacement of previous train, Silchar - Guwahati Passenger Special, for the same route & on the same timings. The train makes its main halt at Badarpur Junction & Lumding Junction for 10 mins and 15 mins respectively & loco/rake reversals also take place at these Stations. The train runs with SGUJ/WDP-4 & NGC/WDM-3A/Twins.

Background
This train was inaugurated on 1 February 2018, from Guwahati flagged off by Piyush Goyal, Minister of Railways for more connectivity between Silchar and Guwahati.

Service

Halts

Traction
As the route is going to be electrified an WDM-3D/ Twins loco pulls the train to its destination on both sides.

External links
 15611 Guwahati Silchar Express
 15612 Silchar Guwahati Express

References

Express trains in India
Rail transport in Assam
Transport in Guwahati
Transport in Silchar